Gushti Kola (also Romanized as Gūshtī Kolā) is a village in Talarpey Rural District, in the Central District of Simorgh County, Mazandaran Province, Iran. At the 2006 census, its population was 28, in 9 families.

References 

Populated places in Simorgh County